Where the Heather Blooms is a 1915 silent film comedy short directed by Al Christie. It was produced by Nestor Film Company and released through Universal Film Manufacturing Company.

Cast
Eddie Lyons - Gordon McKay
Betty Compson - Lady Mary
Lee Moran - First Lord Chamberlain
Harry Rattenberry - Royal Butler
Gus Alexander - Captain of the Guard
Stella Adams - Mary's Mother

See also
Betty Compson filmography

References

External links
 Where the Heather Blooms

1915 films
American silent short films
American black-and-white films
Films directed by Al Christie
Universal Pictures short films
Silent American comedy films
1915 comedy films
1910s American films